Pokkiri Simon is a 2017 Indian Malayalam-language action comedy film directed by Jijo Antony. Sunny Wayne and Prayaga Martin play the lead  roles. whereas Jacob Gregory, Appani Sarath, Nedumudi Venu, Dileesh Pothan, Saiju Kurup, Shammy Thilakan, Baiju Santhosh, Ashokan, Marshall Titto, Bitto, and Thanuja Kartik play in the supporting roles. The film was produced by Krishnan Sethukumar under the banner of Srivari films. The story, screenplay and dialogue of the film were written by Dr. K. Ampady. The cinematography is by Pappinu. The film is loosely based on the life of the Kerala fans of actor Vijay.

Plot 

Simon, Biju and Ganesh who are local boys bound by their love for Vijay. Though their parents want them to earn a living, they lead a carefree life. Arjunan Muthalali and his brother Indran are petty criminals. One day, Simon and friends are returning a cutout of Vijay to a movie theater, and the cutout is hit by Indran's car, breaking its legs. In a rage, they fight with Indran and gang.

Indran is admitted to hospital and Simon is arrested by SI Satyan. Simon is soon released from custody by CI Alex who is close to Simon and the gang. Simon's father constable Yesudas gets a flash drive from a fully burnt body while examining it. Goons sent by Arjunan come to Yesudas' house to retrieve the drive, but Simon fights them off. Knowing the power of Arjunan, Yesudas returns the drive and asks Arjunan to spare his son and friends.

To get in touch with Deepa Simon takes Ganesh's daughter Jennifer to Deepa's dance class. One day Simon drops Jenni off in front of her house after class. Ganesh informs Simon that his daughter is missing. Simon searches for her. He finds out that a racket abducts children and uses them for begging. A man from the gang is brought to his house and Simon interrogates him.

Meanwhile, Jennifer is released by the gang and is admitted to the hospital. Simon learns Arjunan is behind the racket and that some children are used in the organ trade. It is revealed that the burnt body was of doctor Jomon, who had discovered the illegal activities in Arjunan's hospital and placed the details on the flash drive. They burned his body to destroy all evidence related to the crime.

Biju had taken the copy of the contents in the flash drive hoping for an adult film in it. The drive instead contained details of Arjunan's racket. Simon and friends with CI Alex and Prof. Seetharaman meet Arjunan and his gang at their hideout. It is revealed by then  Alex was Arjunan's partner in crime. Alex's intention was to garner local support for the upcoming election without any expense. Hence, he befriended Thalapathy fans and joined forces with Arjunan. But the man from the beggar gang already told Simon about Alex's involvement. The fans fight the villains. Alex and Arjunan and his gang are sent to jail. Alex explains how he ended up in jail to his inmates Jude Anthany Joseph and Sudhi Koppa. Simon has become a police constable and the last scene shows that he and Deepa together watching "Bairavaa" acted by Vijay.

Cast 

 Sunny Wayne as "Pokkiri" Simon
 Prayaga Martin as Deepa
 Jacob Gregory as Hanuman Biju
 Sarath Kumar as Love today Ganesh
 Janaki as Jennifer
 Nedumudi Venu as Prof. Seetha Raman
 Dileesh Pothan as C.I Alex
 Saiju Kurup as Beemapally Noushad
 Shammi Thilakan as Arjunan
 Tito Wilson as Indran
 Ashokan as H.C Yesudas
 Baiju as S.I Sathyan
 Marshal Tito as Indran
 Sajid Yahiya  as Singam Suni
 Vijay Menon as Mariner Somashekahran
 Thara Kalyan  as Sreedevi aka Sree, Deepa's mother
 Bitto as Moosa
 Hemanth Menon as Jomon
 Rajesh Hebbar as Jomon's father
 Renuka  as Mahalakshmi
 Anjali Aneesh as Ganesh's wife, Jayamol
 Thanuja Kartik as Tessa
 Erode Mahesh as Tandoori

 Guest appearances

 Jude Anthany Joseph as a prisoner
 Hannah Reji Koshy as Mariamma
Siddique
 Sudeep Kopa
 Pradeep Kottayam
 Poojappura Radhakrishnan as Hanuman Baiju's father
 Govindan Kutty as Proposed man
 Chempil Ashokan
 Dr. Shaju Sham as Proposed man's father
 KPAC Leelamani as Hanuman Baiju's mother
 Deepika Mohan as Proposed man's mother
 Sreekala Thaha as Nun's mother
 Anita Dileep
 Sreevisakh Mahendran

Music 
The music and background scores are by Gopisundar. The songs are sung by Karthik, Sithara. The film has three songs. The lyrics are by Harinarayanan. The music is released by East Coast Music.

Soundtrack

References

External links 
 

2017 films
2010s Malayalam-language films